Leandro Iván Benegas (born 27 November 1988) is an Argentine-born Chilean professional footballer who plays as a forward for Argentine Primera División club Independiente.

International career
He received his first call up to the Chile senior team to play the 2022 FIFA World Cup qualification match against Colombia on 13 October 2020, replacing Juan Carlos Gaete due to injury, but he didn't make his international debut.

Honours
Universidad de Chile
Primera División (1): 2017–C
Copa Chile (1): 2015
Supercopa (1): 2015

References

External links
 
 

1988 births
Living people
Sportspeople from Mendoza, Argentina
Argentine footballers
Argentine sportspeople of Chilean descent
Argentine expatriate footballers
Association football forwards
Naturalized citizens of Chile
Chilean footballers
Chilean expatriate footballers
Independiente Rivadavia footballers
Deportivo Laferrere footballers
Deportivo Armenio footballers
Club Atlético Huracán footballers
Comisión de Actividades Infantiles footballers
Club Atlético River Plate footballers
Unión La Calera footballers
Universidad de Chile footballers
Audax Italiano footballers
Club Deportivo Palestino footballers
Curicó Unido footballers
Club Atlético Independiente footballers
Colo-Colo footballers
Chilean Primera División players
Argentine Primera División players
Argentine expatriate sportspeople in Chile
Expatriate footballers in Chile